Nassim El Ablak (born 7 January 2000) is a Dutch footballer who plays as a midfielder for Derde Divisie club DVS '33.

Club career
On 22 May 2019, El Ablak signed his first professional contract with Fortuna Sittard. El Ablak made his professional debut with Fortuna Sittard in a 1-1 Eredivisie tie with SC Heerenveen on 31 August 2019.

El Ablak joined Derde Divisie club DVS '33 on a free on 27 October 2021 after his contract had expired with Fortuna. On 25 May 2022, he extended his contract with DVS until 2023.

Personal life
Born in the Netherlands, El Ablak is of Moroccan descent.

References

External links
 
 Fortuna Sittard Profile

2000 births
Living people
People from Harderwijk
Footballers from Gelderland
Dutch footballers
Dutch sportspeople of Moroccan descent
Association football midfielders
SC Heerenveen players
PEC Zwolle players
VVOG players
Fortuna Sittard players
DVS '33 players
Eredivisie players
Derde Divisie players